"Stronger Together" is the second single from freestyle singer Shannon's second album Do You Wanna Get Away.

Track listing
US 12" single

Charts

References

External links

1985 singles
Shannon (singer) songs
Song recordings produced by Chris Barbosa
Mirage Records singles
1985 songs